A list of universities in Seoul, South Korea:

National universities
Korea National Sport University
Korea National University of Arts
Seoul National University
Seoul National University of Education
Seoul National University of Technology

Public universities
University of Seoul

Private universities
Catholic University of Korea
Chugye University for the Arts
Chung-Ang University
Dongduk Women's University
Dongguk University
Duksung Women's University
Ewha Womans University
Hankuk University of Foreign Studies
Hansung University
Hanyang University
Hongik University
Konkuk University
Kookmin University
Korea University
Kwangwoon University
Kyonggi University
Kyung Hee University
Myongji University
Sahmyook University
Sangmyung University
Sejong University
Seokyeong University
Seoul Women's University
Sogang University
Sookmyung Women's University
Soongsil University
Sungkonghoe University
Sungkyunkwan University
Sungshin Women's University
Yonsei University

 
Seoul
Seoul
universities and colleges